Dransfeld is a Samtgemeinde ("collective municipality") in the district of Göttingen, in Lower Saxony, Germany. Its seat is in the town Dransfeld.

The Samtgemeinde Dransfeld consists of the following municipalities:

 Bühren
 Dransfeld
 Jühnde
 Niemetal
 Scheden

Samtgemeinden in Lower Saxony